"Precious Love" is the fourth and the final single from Jody Watley's second album, Larger Than Life. "Precious Love" was the least successful of the four singles released from the album, it peaked at number 87 on the US Billboard Hot 100 chart, but did find better success on the R&B chart where it peaked at number 51.

Charts

References

Jody Watley songs
1990 singles
Songs written by André Cymone
Songs written by Jody Watley
1989 songs
MCA Records singles
Song recordings produced by André Cymone